Ludwik Fleck (11 July 1896 – 5 June 1961) was a Polish Jewish and Israeli physician and biologist who did important work in epidemic typhus in Lwów, Poland, with Rudolf Weigl and in the 1930s developed the concepts of the "Denkstil" ("thought style") and the "Denkkollektiv" ("thought collective").

The concept of the "thought collective" defined by him is important in the philosophy of science and in logology (the "science of science"), helping to explain how scientific ideas change over time, much as in Thomas Kuhn's later notion of the "paradigm shift" and in Michel Foucault's concept of the "episteme". His account of the development of facts at the intersection of active elements of the thought collective and the passive resistances of nature provides a way of considering the particular culture of modern science as evolutionary and evidence-oriented.

Life 
Fleck was born in Lemberg (Lwów in Polish, now L'viv, Ukraine) and grew up in the cultural autonomy of the Austrian province of Galicia. He graduated from a Polish lyceum (secondary school) in 1914 and enrolled at Lwów's Jan Kazimierz University, where he received his medical degree.

In 1920 he became an assistant to the famous typhus specialist Rudolf Weigl at Jan Kazimierz University. From 1923 to 1935 Fleck worked in the department of internal medicine at Lwów General Hospital, then became director of the bacteriological laboratory at the local social security authority. From 1935 he worked at the private bacteriological laboratory which he had earlier founded.

With Nazi Germany's occupation of L'viv, Fleck was deported with his wife, Ernestina Waldmann, and son Ryszard to the city's Jewish ghetto. He continued his research in the hospital and developed a new procedure in which he procured a vaccine from the urine of typhus patients. Fleck's work was known to the German occupiers and his family were arrested in December 1942 and deported to the Laokoon pharmaceutical factory to produce a typhus serum. He and his family were arrested again and sent to the Auschwitz concentration camp on February 7, 1943. His task was to diagnose syphilis, typhus and other illnesses using serological tests. From December 1943 until the liberation of Poland on April 11, 1945, Fleck was detained in Buchenwald concentration camp; there, he worked with Marian Ciepielowski to produce a working typhus vaccine for camp inmates, while producing a fake vaccine for the SS.

Between 1945 and 1952, he served as the head of the Institute of Microbiology of the School of Medicine of Maria Sklodowska-Curie University of Lublin. In 1952, he moved to Warsaw to become the Director of the Department of Microbiology and Immunology at the Mother and Child State Institute. In 1954 he was elected a member of the Polish Academy of Sciences. Fleck's research during these years focused on the question of the behavior of leucocytes in infectious and stress situations. Between 1946 and 1957 he published 87 medical and scientific articles in Polish, French, English and Swiss journals. In 1951 Fleck was awarded the National Prize for Scientific Achievements and in 1955 the Officer's Cross of the Order of Polonia Restituta.

In 1956, after a heart attack and the discovery that he was suffering from lymphosarcoma, Fleck emigrated to Israel where a position was created for him at the Israel Institute for Biological Research. He died in 1961 at the age of 64 of a second heart attack.

The Ludwik Fleck Prize is awarded annually for the best book in the area of science and technology studies. It was created by the 4S Council (Society for the Social Studies of Science) in 1992.

Thought collective 

Fleck wrote that the development of truth in scientific research was an unattainable ideal as different researchers were locked into thought collectives (or thought-styles). This means "that a pure and direct observation cannot exist: in the act of perceiving objects the observer, i.e. the epistemological subject, is always influenced by the epoch and the environment to which he belongs, that is by what Fleck calls the thought style". Thought style throughout Fleck's work is closely associated with representational style. A "fact" was a relative value, expressed in the language or symbolism of the thought collective in which it belonged, and subject to the social and temporal structure of this collective. He argued, however, that within the active cultural style of a thought collective, knowledge claims or facts were constrained by passive elements arising from the observations and experience of the natural world. This passive resistance of natural experience represented within the stylized means of the thought collective could be verified by anyone adhering to the culture of the thought collective, and thus facts could be agreed upon within any particular thought style. Thus while a fact may be verifiable within its own collective, it may be unverifiable in others. He felt that the development of scientific facts and concepts was not unidirectional and does not consist of just accumulating new pieces of information, but at times required changing older concepts, methods of observations, and forms of representation. This changing of prior knowledge is difficult because a collective attains over time a specific way of investigating, bringing with it a blindness to alternative ways of observing and conceptualization. Change was especially possible when members of two thought collectives met and cooperated in observing, formulating hypothesis and ideas. He strongly advocated comparative epistemology. He also notes some features of the culture of modern natural sciences that recognize provisionality and evolution of knowledge along the value of pursuit of passive resistances. This approach anticipated later developments in social constructionism, and especially the development of critical science and technology studies.

Honors
1954: Fleck became a member of the Polish Academy of Sciences.
1955: He was honored with the Order of Polonia Restituta (Officer's Cross).

Bibliography
 The Problem of Epistemology [1936] (in R. S. Cohen and T. Schnelle (eds.), Cognition and Fact: Materials on Ludwik Fleck, Dordrecht: Reidel, 1986)
 Genesis and Development of a Scientific Fact (edited by T. J. Trenn and R. K. Merton, foreword by Thomas Kuhn), Chicago: University of Chicago Press, 1979. This is the first English translation of Entstehung und Entwicklung einer wissenschaftlichen Tatsache. Einführung in die Lehre vom Denkstil und Denkkollektiv Schwabe und Co., Verlagsbuchhandlung, Basel, 1935.
 Erfahrung und Tatsache. Suhrkamp Verlag, Frankfurt am Main 1983,  (Essays, with a complete Bibliography of Ludwik Fleck, Reihe Suhrkamp Wissenschaft, stw 404).
 Denkstile und Tatsachen: Gesammelte Schriften und Zeugnisse.  (suhrkamp taschenbuch wissenschaft), (large collection of essays, with a completed Bibliography of Ludwik Fleck, 682 p.; ed. by Sylwia Werner, Claus Zittel, Frankfurt am Main 2011.
 Investigation of epidemic typhus in the Ghetto of Lwów in 1941–1942. (PDF; 31 kB)

See also
 List of Poles

Further reading
 Arthur Allen, The Fantastic Laboratory of Dr. Weigl: How Two Brave Scientists Battled Typhus and Sabotaged the Nazis, Norton, 2014, .
 Claus Zittel, "Ludwik Fleck and the concept of Style in the natural sciences", in: Studies in East European Thought, 2012,  Nr. 1–2, p. 53-79.

References

External links

Short introduction to Fleck's philosophy and sociology of science

4S Ludwik Fleck Prize
How Scientists Created A Typhus Vaccine in a 'Fantastic Laboratory'. Fresh Air, NPR books author interviews, July 22, 2014. 'Listen to the Story' for excerpts related to Ludwik Fleck

1896 births
1961 deaths
Historians of science
Polish biologists
Polish sociologists
Jewish microbiologists
20th-century Polish Jews
Jewish philosophers
Members of the Polish Academy of Sciences
Recipients of the Order of Polonia Restituta
Physicians from Lviv
Polish emigrants to Israel
Auschwitz concentration camp survivors
Buchenwald concentration camp survivors
20th-century biologists
20th-century Polish philosophers
Philosophers of science